, born October 31, 1981 in Niigata, Japan, is a former singer and current radio personality. She was the leader of Melon Kinenbi, an all-girl J-pop group formerly within Hello! Project, until its disbandment in 2010. She is also a former member of Hello! Project's futsal club, Gatas Brilhantes H.P.

History
In August 2010, less than three months after Melon Kinenbi's disbandment, Saito married comedian Jirō Hachimitsu (born Jirō Takano) of duo "Tokyo Dynamite".

On October 15, 2011, it was announced that Hitomi and Tokyo Dynamite's Hachimitsu Jiro have divorced.

After disappearing temporarily from the public eye after Melon Kinenbi's disbandment, Saito returned as a radio personality on FM-Niigata, which she currently remains active as.

Appearances

Photobooks

TV shows

Radio

References

External links

1981 births
Living people
People from Niigata (city)
Melon Kinenbi members
Japanese idols
Japanese women pop singers
Musicians from Niigata Prefecture